NCSL can refer to several things:

National College for School Leadership – British government-funded Non-Departmental Public Body for head teachers and school leaders
National Conference of State Legislatures – non-governmental organization for members and staff of US state legislatures
NCSL International – non-profit organization concerned with metrology and related fields